Minimax Limited was a British manufacturer of fire extinguishers founded in England in 1903. Their unique conical fire extinguisher was known as 'The Minimax'. The company was purchased by The Pyrene Company Limited in 1955.

History 

Minimax Limited opened their first office in England in 1903 in Leadenhall Street, London, with one salesman. In 1905, they won the 'highest award' for extinguishers in a St. Louis exhibition. In 1907 Minimax were suppliers to King Edward VII for protection of his motor car, and were exporting to countries such as Argentina, China, Siam, India, and Tasmania. In England, extinguishers had been supplied to Westminster Abbey, Windsor Castle, Winchester Cathedral, and Oxford and Cambridge universities.

A new factory was built at Feltham, Middlesex, in 1911, at the junction of Staines Road and Fagg's Road, 'Minimax Corner', which became a famous landmark.. Soon 1,000 extinguishers a month were being produced. The Czar of Russia placed an order for extinguishers for his yacht Polar Star, and the Siberian Railway was supplied with Minimax extinguishers. Two hundred extinguishers a day were produced during the First World War, along with many thousands of aerial bombs. Between the wars, many new developments were introduced, including CO2 extinguishers. Colliery protection with remote-controlled extinguishers became a speciality. Distillation plants for producing fresh water from salt water were made from 1939 to 1945, with one order for 600 from the Dutch Navy.

Minimax was purchased by The Pyrene Company Limited in 1955. Pyrene was taken over by Chubb Security in 1967.

The factory was closed and demolished in the 1980s, the site has now been refurbished by Nevill Long & Encon Ltd and is their West London Interiors Distribution Centre. The factory's Art Deco gateway was saved and now stands as public art overlooking 'Minimax Corner'. A nearby cul-de-sac is also called Minimax Close.

See also

Chubb Fire
Chubb Security
Chubb Locks
Read and Campbell Limited
Rampart Engineering
The Pyrene Company Limited

References

External links 
 http://www.gracesguide.co.uk/Minimax
 http://www.chubb.co.uk

Firefighting equipment
Defunct manufacturing companies of the United Kingdom
Manufacturing companies based in London
Companies based in the London Borough of Hounslow
History of the London Borough of Hounslow
1955 mergers and acquisitions